Sergei Vladimirovich Neretin (born 16 January 1980) is a Russian former professional footballer.

Honours
 Russian Premier League runner-up: 1999.
 Kazakhstan Premier League champion: 2001.

External links
 Profile at playerhistory.com 

1980 births
Living people
Russian footballers
Russian Premier League players
Russian expatriate footballers
Expatriate footballers in Kazakhstan
FC Lokomotiv Moscow players
FC Zhenis Astana players
FC Sibir Novosibirsk players
Russian expatriate sportspeople in Kazakhstan
Association football midfielders
FC Dynamo Saint Petersburg players
FC Dynamo Bryansk players
FC Sportakademklub Moscow players
FC Mashuk-KMV Pyatigorsk players